A Style For You was a South Korean fashion-beauty show that encourages idols to create their own fashion styles instead of relying on stylists. It airs every Sunday on KBS2 at 11:55 p.m. KST.

Broadcast time

Host
 Main MC
 Heechul
 Yoon Bo-ra
 Goo Hara
 Ahn Hee-yeon
 Special MC
 Cho Saeho (episode 7)
 Heo Young-ji (episode 9)

Format
A Style For You is the first global interactive style show to air on a main broadcast station, (KBS). It showcases the 4 idols' honest, real lives and their various characters.

Global style hashtags
The Mega-Project of "A Style For You".

List of episodes

Rating 
In the ratings below, the highest rating for the show will be in red, and the lowest rating for the show will be in blue.

References

External links 
 
 
 
 

2015 South Korean television series debuts
2015 South Korean television series endings
Korean-language television shows
Korean Broadcasting System original programming